Jonzun Crew was an American electro and early funk–hip hop group that was active in the 1980s. The group was led by Michael Jonzun, his brothers Maurice Starr and Soni Jonzun, and Carl (Captain Fingers).

Overview
The Jonzun Crew was formed by Florida-born brothers Michael, Soni, and Larry Johnson (also known as Maurice Starr) in Boston in 1981, with Gordy Worthy and Steve Thorpe filling out the lineup. The group carried its spin on Parliament-Funkadelic's loopy sci-fi themes of Afro-futurism throughout the 1980s and early 1990s for several albums.

The group's most famous tracks, “Pack Jam (Look out for the OVC),” “Space is the Place,” and “Space Cowboy” were featured on the group's debut album, Lost in Space (1983). Other notable tracks included “We Are the Jonzun Crew” and “Ground Control.” The group's sound was particularly unique because all of the synthesizer parts were played live as opposed to sequenced, and despite using drum-machine hits in its tracks, most of the group's songs used a live drummer as the main drum track, giving its songs a unique groove and swing compared with most electro music of the era.

In 1986, Michael Jonzun left the group.

Cultural impact
“Pack Jam (Look out for the OVC)” was often played in the background while the rundown of top hits in Germany were counted on the German-language Top Hits show  during the 1980s.

By 1987, the Berlin Wall featured a block long graffiti mural immortalizing Jonzun Crew.

In 1998, Tommy Boy Records issued a remix of "Pack Jam" by Grooverider as part of its Greatest Beats Remix series.

Discography

Albums

Singles

References

External links
 Discography at Discogs.

Electronic music groups from Massachusetts
American electro musicians
Tommy Boy Records artists
A&M Records artists